Pearl Harbor is a 2001 American romantic war drama film directed by Michael Bay, produced by Bay and Jerry Bruckheimer and written by Randall Wallace. It stars Ben Affleck, Kate Beckinsale, Josh Hartnett, Cuba Gooding Jr., Tom Sizemore, Jon Voight, Colm Feore, and Alec Baldwin. The film features a heavily fictionalized version of the attack on Pearl Harbor by Japanese forces on December 7, 1941, focusing on a love story set amidst the lead up to the attack, its aftermath, and the Doolittle Raid.

The film was a box office success, earning $59 million in its opening weekend and nearly $450 million worldwide, but received generally negative reviews from critics, who criticized the story, long runtime, screenplay and dialogue, pacing, performances and historical inaccuracies, although the visual effects and Hans Zimmer's score were praised. It was nominated for four Academy Awards, winning in the category of Best Sound Editing. However, it was also nominated for six Golden Raspberry Awards, including Worst Picture. This marked the first (and to date, only) occurrence of a Worst Picture-nominated film winning an Academy Award; it is also the only film directed by Bay to win an Academy Award.

Plot
In 1923 Tennessee, two best friends, Rafe McCawley and Danny Walker, play together in the back of an old biplane, pretending to be fighting airmen.

In January 1941, with World War II raging, Danny and Rafe are both first lieutenants under the command of Major Jimmy Doolittle. Doolittle informs Rafe that he has been accepted into the Eagle Squadron (an RAF outfit for American pilots during the Battle of Britain). A nurse named Evelyn Johnson passes Rafe's medical exam despite his dyslexia, and the two strike up a relationship. Four weeks later, Rafe and Evelyn, now deeply in love, enjoy an evening of dancing at a nightclub and later a jaunt in the New York harbor in a borrowed police boat. Rafe shocks Evelyn by saying that he has joined the Eagle Squadron and is leaving the next day. During a mission to intercept a Luftwaffe bombing raid, Rafe is shot down over the English Channel and is presumed killed in action. Danny and Evelyn mourn Rafe's death together, which spurs a romance between the two.

Meanwhile, Japan prepares to attack the US Pacific Fleet, deciding the best way to do so would be a decisive strike on the Pearl Harbor naval base.

On the night of December 6, Evelyn is shocked to discover Rafe standing outside her door, having survived his drowning and the ensuing months trapped in Nazi-occupied France. Rafe, in turn, discovers Danny's romance with Evelyn and leaves for the Hula bar, where he is welcomed back by his overjoyed fellow pilots. Danny finds a drunken Rafe in the bar with the intention of reconciling, but the two get into a fight. They drive away, avoiding being put in the brig when the military police arrive at the bar. The two fall asleep in Danny's car.

Next morning, on December 7, the Imperial Japanese Navy begins its attack on Pearl Harbor. The US Pacific Fleet is severely damaged in the surprise attack, and most of the defending airfields are obliterated before they are able to launch fighters to defend the harbor. Rafe and Danny take off in P-40 fighter planes, and they shoot down several of the attacking planes. They later assist in the rescue of the crew of the capsized , but are too late to save the crew of the obliterated .

The next day, President Franklin D. Roosevelt delivers his Day of Infamy speech to the nation and requests that the US Congress declare a state of war with the Empire of Japan. The survivors attend a memorial service to honor the numerous dead. Danny and Rafe are both assigned to travel stateside under Doolittle, though they are not told why. Before they leave, Evelyn reveals to Rafe that she is pregnant with Danny's child. She intends to stay with and devote herself to Danny for their child’s sake, but she vows that it is Rafe who she will always truly love. 

Danny and Rafe are both promoted to captain and awarded the Silver Star for their actions at Pearl Harbor, and Doolittle asks them to volunteer for a secret mission. During the next three months, Rafe, Danny and other pilots train for ultra-short takeoffs with specially modified B-25 Mitchell bombers. In April, the raiders are sent toward Japan on board . Their mission is to bomb Tokyo, after which they will land in China. The mission is successful, but Rafe's and Danny's planes run out of fuel and crash in Japanese-occupied territory in China. A gunfight ensues between the raiders and Japanese ground troops, and Danny is mortally wounded shielding Rafe before the group are rescued by Chinese soldiers. Rafe tearfully reveals to Danny that Evelyn is pregnant with Danny's child; with his dying breaths, Danny tells Rafe that it is his child now.

After the war, Rafe and Evelyn, now married, visit Danny's grave with Evelyn's son, named Danny after his biological father. Rafe then asks his stepson if he would like to go flying, and they fly off into the sunset in the old biplane that Rafe's father once owned.

Cast

Fictional characters

 Ben Affleck as the First Lieutenant / Captain Rafe McCawley, a USAAC combat pilot and one of the three protagonists. He is childhood friends with Danny Walker.
 Jesse James as Young Rafe McCawley.
 Josh Hartnett as First Lieutenant / Captain Danny Walker, a USAAC combat pilot and Rafe's lifelong best friend, one of the three protagonists.
 Reiley McClendon as Young Danny Walker.
 Kate Beckinsale as Lieutenant Evelyn Johnson, a nurse and Rafe and Danny's mutual love interest, one of the three protagonists.
 Tom Sizemore as Sergeant Earl Sistern, the lead aircraft mechanic at Wheeler Airfield.
 Jaime King as Betty Bayer, a nurse at Tripler Army Hospital and colleague of Evelyn's.
 Catherine Kellner as Barbara, a nurse at Tripler Army Hospital and colleague of Evelyn's.
 Jennifer Garner as Sandra, a nurse at Tripler Army Hospital and colleague of Evelyn's.
 Sara Rue as Martha, a nurse at Tripler Army Hospital and colleague of Evelyn's.
 William Lee Scott as First Lieutenant Billy Thompson, a USAAC combat pilot stationed at Wheeler Airfield.
 Ewen Bremner as First Lieutenant "Red" Winkle, a USAAC combat pilot stationed at Wheeler Airfield.
 Greg Zola as First Lieutenant Anthony Fusco, a USAAC combat pilot stationed at Wheeler Airfield.
 Michael Shannon as First Lieutenant "Gooz" Wood, a USAAC combat pilot stationed at Wheeler Airfield.
 Matt Davis as Second Lieutenant Joe McKinnon, a USAAC combat pilot stationed at Wheeler Airfield.
 Dan Aykroyd as Captain Harold Thurman, a US Naval Intelligence officer overseeing the monitoring of Japanese espionage efforts. He is a fictionalized composite of several real-world individuals.
 Kim Coates as Lieutenant Jack Richards, a United States Naval Aviator who participates in the Doolittle Raid.
 Tony Curran as Ian, a Royal Air Force combat pilot in Eagle Squadron.
 Nicholas Farrell as a Royal Air Force Squadron leader and combat pilot commanding the Eagle Squadron.
 William Fichtner as Mr. Walker, Danny's father.
 Steve Rankin as Mr. McCawley, Rafe's father.
 John Fujioka as General Nishikura, head of the Japanese Supreme War Council. He is a fictionalized composite of several real-world individuals.
 Leland Orser as Major Jackson, a USAAC officer injured during the attack on Pearl Harbor.
 Ted McGinley as Major Newman, a US Army officer.
 Andrew Bryniarski as Joe, a crew member and amateur boxer aboard the USS West Virginia.
 Brandon Lozano as Baby Danny McCawley, Danny and Evelyn's son.
 Eric Christian Olsen as a B-25 gunner to McCawley.
 Sean Faris as a B-25 gunner to Walker.

Historical characters
Although not intended to be an entirely accurate depiction of events, the film includes portrayals of several historical figures:

 Cuba Gooding Jr. as Petty Officer Second Class Doris Miller, a messman aboard the USS West Virginia who operated anti-aircraft guns during the attack on Pearl Harbor.
 Jon Voight as President Franklin D. Roosevelt, the President of the United States
 Colm Feore as Admiral Husband E. Kimmel, the commander-in-chief of the United States Fleet and the U.S. Pacific Fleet.
 Mako as Kaigun Taishō (Admiral) Isoroku Yamamoto, Fleet Admiral of the Imperial Japanese Navy and mastermind of the attack on Pearl Harbor.
 Alec Baldwin as Major (later Lieutenant Colonel) Jimmy Doolittle, USAF commander and leader of the Doolittle Raid.
 Cary-Hiroyuki Tagawa as Kaigun Chūsa (Commander) Minoru Genda, lead planner of the attack on Pearl Harbor.
 Scott Wilson as General George C. Marshall, the US Army's Chief of Staff.
 Graham Beckel as Admiral Chester W. Nimitz, a US Naval commander who later succeeded Kimmel as the Pacific Fleet's Commander-in-Chief.
 Tom Everett as Frank Knox, Secretary of the Navy.
 Tomas Arana as Rear-Admiral Frank Jack Fletcher, Commander Cruiser Division Four.
 Peter Firth as Captain Mervyn S. Bennion, commanding officer of the USS West Virginia
 Glenn Morshower as Vice Admiral William Halsey Jr., commander of Carrier Division 2 and the Aircraft Battle Force.
 Yuji Okumoto as Kaigun-Daii (Lieutenant) Zenji Abe (1916-2007), bomber pilot in the attack on Pearl Harbor.
 Madison Mason as Admiral Raymond A. Spruance, commander of Cruiser Division Five.
 Michael Shamus Wiles as Captain Marc Mitscher, captain of the USS Hornet.
 Seth Sakai as Takeo Yoshikawa, a Japanese spy.

Production

The proposed budget of $208 million that Bay and Bruckheimer wanted was an area of contention with Disney executives, since a great deal of the budget was to be expended on production aspects. Also controversial was the effort to change the film's rating from R to PG-13. Bay initially wanted to graphically portray the horrors of war and was not interested in primarily marketing the final product to a teen and young adult audience. However, even though he wanted to make an R-rated movie, Bay admitted that the problem was that young children would not be able to see it, and he felt that they should. As such, when he was ordered by Disney to make a PG-13 movie, he didn't argue. As a compromise, he was allowed to release an R-rated Director's Cut on DVD later on in 2002. Budget fights continued throughout the planning of the film, with Bay "walking" on several occasions. Dick Cook, chairman of Disney at the time, said "I think Pearl Harbor was one of the most difficult shoots of modern history."

In order to recreate the atmosphere of pre-war Pearl Harbor, the producers staged the film in Hawaii and used current naval facilities. Many active duty military members stationed in Hawaii and members of the local population served as extras during the filming. The set at Rosarito Beach in the Mexican state of Baja California was used for scale model work as required. Formerly the set of Titanic (1997), Rosarito was the ideal location to recreate the death throes of the battleships in the Pearl Harbor attack. A large-scale model of the bow section of  mounted on the world's largest gimbal produced an authentic rolling and submerging of the doomed battleship. Production Engineer Nigel Phelps stated that the sequence of the ship rolling out of the water and slapping down would involve one of the "biggest set elements" to be staged. Matched with computer generated imagery, the action had to reflect precision and accuracy throughout.

The vessel most seen in the movie was USS Lexington, representing both USS Hornet and a Japanese carrier. All aircraft take-offs during the movie were filmed on board the Lexington, a museum ship in Corpus Christi, Texas. The aircraft on display were removed for filming and were replaced with film aircraft as well as World War II anti-aircraft turrets. Other ships used in filler scenes included , and  during filming for the carrier sequences. Filming was also done on board the museum battleship  located near Houston, Texas.

Release

Marketing
Disney premiered the film at Pearl Harbor itself, aboard the active nuclear aircraft carrier , which made a six-day trip from San Diego to serve as "the world's largest and most expensive outdoor theater". More than 2,000 people attended the premiere on the Stennis, which had special grandstand seating and one of the world's largest movie screens assembled on the flight deck. The guests included various Hawaii political leaders, most of the lead actors from the film, and over 500 news media from around the world that Disney flew in to cover the event. The party was estimated to have cost Disney $5 million.

Box office
During its opening weekend, Pearl Harbor generated a total of $59 million, then made $75.1 million during its first four days. At the time, it achieved the second-highest Memorial Day weekend gross, behind The Lost World: Jurassic Park. When the film was released, it topped the box office, knocking out Shrek. It earned $30 million during its second weekend while staying at the number one spot. This was the most recent film to top the box office for multiple weeks until that August when American Pie 2 became the next one to do so. The film would then drop into third place behind Swordfish and Shrek, making $14.9 million. Pearl Harbor grossed $198,542,554 at the US and Canadian box office and $250,678,391 overseas for a worldwide total of $449,220,945. The film was ranked the sixth highest-earning picture of 2001. In Japan, the film opened on 424 screens and grossed $7.2 million in its opening weekend (including $1.6 million in previews), a record for Buena Vista International in Japan, and the sixth highest opening of all-time. It had a record opening in China, grossing $3.9 million in 6 days. It is also the third highest-grossing romantic drama film of all time, as of January 2013, behind Titanic and Ghost.

Home media
The film was released on VHS and DVD on December 4, 2001. In its first week, it sold more than 7 million units and made more than $130 million in retail sales.

The film was also released in 2002 as an R-rated four-disc Director's Cut DVD, which included about a minute of additional footage.

Reception
On Rotten Tomatoes, the film holds an approval rating of 24% based on 194 reviews, with an average rating of 4.5/10. The site's critical consensus reads: "Pearl Harbor tries to be the Titanic of war movies, but it's just a tedious romance filled with laughably bad dialogue. The 40-minute action sequence is spectacular, though." On Metacritic, the film has a score of 44 out of 100 based on 35 reviews, indicating "mixed or average reviews". Audiences surveyed by CinemaScore gave the film a grade "A-" on scale of A to F.

Roger Ebert of the Chicago Sun-Times gave the film one and a half stars, writing: "Pearl Harbor is a two-hour movie squeezed into three hours, about how, on Dec. 7, 1941, the Japanese staged a surprise attack on an American love triangle. Its centerpiece is 40 minutes of redundant special effects, surrounded by a love story of stunning banality. The film has been directed without grace, vision, or originality, and although you may walk out quoting lines of dialogue, it will not be because you admire them." Ebert also criticized the liberties the film took with historical facts: "There is no sense of history, strategy or context; according to this movie, Japan attacked Pearl Harbor because America cut off its oil supply, and they were down to an 18-month reserve. Would going to war restore the fuel sources? Did they perhaps also have imperialist designs? Movie doesn't say." In his later "Great Movies" essay on Lawrence of Arabia, Ebert likewise wrote, "What you realize watching Lawrence of Arabia is that the word 'epic' refers not to the cost or the elaborate production, but to the size of the ideas and vision. Werner Herzog's Aguirre, the Wrath of God didn't cost as much as the catering in Pearl Harbor, but it is an epic, and Pearl Harbor is not."

A. O. Scott of the New York Times wrote, "Nearly every line of the script drops from the actors' mouths with the leaden clank of exposition, timed with bad sitcom beats." USA Today gave the film two out of four stars and wrote, "Ships, planes and water combust and collide in Pearl Harbor, but nothing else does in one of the wimpiest wartime romances ever filmed."

In his review for The Washington Post, Desson Howe wrote, "although this Walt Disney movie is based, inspired and even partially informed by a real event referred to as Pearl Harbor, the movie is actually based on the movies Top Gun, Titanic and Saving Private Ryan. Don't get confused." Peter Travers of Rolling Stone magazine wrote, "Affleck, Hartnett and Beckinsale – a British actress without a single worthy line to wrap her credible American accent around – are attractive actors, but they can't animate this moldy romantic triangle." Time magazine's Richard Schickel criticized the love triangle: "It requires a lot of patience for an audience to sit through the dithering. They're nice kids and all that, but they don't exactly claw madly at one another. It's as if they know that someday they're going to be part of "the Greatest Generation" and don't want to offend Tom Brokaw. Besides, megahistory and personal history never integrate here."

Entertainment Weekly was more positive, giving the film a "B−" rating, and Owen Gleiberman praised the Pearl Harbor attack sequence: "Bay's staging is spectacular but also honorable in its scary, hurtling exactitude. ... There are startling point-of-view shots of torpedoes dropping into the water and speeding toward their targets, and though Bay visualizes it all with a minimum of graphic carnage, he invites us to register the terror of the men standing helplessly on deck, the horrifying split-second deliverance as bodies go flying and explosions reduce entire battleships to liquid walls of collapsing metal."

In his review for The New York Observer, Andrew Sarris wrote, "here is the ironic twist in my acceptance of Pearl Harbor – the parts I liked most are the parts before and after the digital destruction of Pearl Harbor by the Japanese carrier planes" and felt that "Pearl Harbor is not so much about World War II as it is about movies about World War II. And what's wrong with that?"

Critics in Japan received the film more positively than in most countries with one likening it to Gone with the Wind set during World War II and another describing it as more realistic than Tora! Tora! Tora!.

Accolades

Historical accuracy

Like many historical dramas, Pearl Harbor provoked debate about the artistic license taken by its producers and director. National Geographic Channel produced a documentary called Beyond the Movie: Pearl Harbor detailing some of the ways that "the film's final cut didn't reflect all the attacks' facts, or represent them all accurately". The film was ranked number three on Careeraftermilitary.com's "10 Most Inaccurate Military Movies Ever Made," which also included The Patriot, The Hurt Locker, U-571, The Green Berets, Windtalkers, Battle of the Bulge, Red Tails, Enemy at the Gates and Flyboys on its list of falsified war movie productions.

Many surviving victims of Pearl Harbor dismissed the film as grossly inaccurate and pure Hollywood. In an interview done by Frank Wetta, producer Jerry Bruckheimer was quoted saying: "We tried to be accurate, but it's certainly not meant to be a history lesson." Historian Lawrence Suid's review is particularly detailed as to the major factual misrepresentations of the film and the negative impact they have even on an entertainment film, as he notes that "the very name of the film implies that audiences will be witnessing a historic event, accurately rendered."

The inclusion of Affleck's character in the Eagle Squadron is another inaccurate aspect of the film, since active-duty U.S. airmen were prohibited from joining the squadron, although some American civilians did join the RAF. The Battle of Britain had already ended in October 1940 whereas the film has it still happening in early 1941 with dogfights over the English Channel. None of the "Eagle Squadrons" of American volunteers saw action in Europe before 1941.

One of the film's scenes shows Japanese aircraft targeting medical staff and the base's hospital. Although it was damaged in the attack, the Japanese did not deliberately target the U.S. naval hospital and only a single member of its medical staff was killed as he crossed the navy yard to report for duty.

Critics decried the use of fictional replacements for real people, declaring that Pearl Harbor was an "abuse of artistic license." The roles the two male leads have in the attack sequence are analogous to the real historical deeds of United States Army Air Forces Second Lieutenants George Welch and Kenneth M. Taylor, who took to the skies in P-40 Warhawk aircraft during the Japanese attack and, together, claimed six Japanese aircraft and a few probables. Taylor, who died in November 2006, called the film adaptation "a piece of trash... over-sensationalized and distorted."

The harshest criticism was aimed at instances in the film where actual historical events were altered for dramatic purposes. For example, Admiral Kimmel did not receive the report that a Japanese midget submarine was being attacked until after the bombs began falling, and did not receive the first official notification of the attack until several hours after the attack ended.

The scene following the attack on Pearl Harbor, where President Roosevelt demands an immediate retaliatory strike on the soil of Japan, did not happen as portrayed in the film. Admiral Chester Nimitz and General George Marshall are seen denying the possibility of an aerial attack on Japan, but in real life they actually advocated such a strike. Another inconsistency in this scene is when President Roosevelt (who was at this time in his life, stricken and confined to a wheelchair due to Polio) is able to stand up to challenge his staff's distrust in a strike on Japan, which never really happened. During the same scene, a military advisor indicates that Japan was close to invading the continental United States, and could potentially expand "as far as Chicago;" in reality, Japan had neither the manpower nor the firepower to invade nearby Australia and Siberia, let alone the mainland United States.

In another scene Admiral Yamamoto says "I fear all we have done is to awaken a sleeping giant," a quote which was copied from the 1970 film Tora! Tora! Tora!, even though there is no printed evidence to prove Yamamoto made this statement or wrote it down.

The portrayal of the planning of the Doolittle Raid, the air raid itself, and the raid's aftermath, is considered one of the most historically inaccurate portions of the film. In the film, Jimmy Doolittle and the rest of the Doolittle raiders had to launch from USS Hornet 624 miles off the Japanese coast and after being spotted by a few Japanese patrol boats. In actuality, the Doolittle raiders had to launch 650 miles off the Japanese coast and after being spotted by only one Japanese patrol boat. In the film, the only raiders shown in the raid are depicted as dropping their bombs on Tokyo, with some of the bomb blasts obliterating entire buildings. In actuality, the Doolittle raiders did bomb Tokyo but also targeted three other industrial cities, and the damage inflicted was minimal. Prior to the raid a chalkboard containing plans for the raid does accurately reflect other destination cities, but this is mostly obscured from view and never discussed in the dialogue. The same chalkboard does mostly contain the names of the actual Doolittle Raiders in all but the 6th and 9th aircraft where the fictional names of the two main characters are substituted. The film shows the Doolittle raider airmen in China overcoming the Japanese soldiers in a short gun battle with help from a strafing B-25, which never happened in real life.

Other inconsistencies and anachronisms

Numerous other inconsistencies and anachronisms are present in the film, and it appears that "little to no effort was used to try and hide or disguise modern warships to match the early 1940s setting."

Some other historical inaccuracies found in the film include the early childhood scenes depicting a Stearman biplane crop duster in 1923; the aircraft was not accurate for the period, as the first commercial crop-dusting company did not begin operation until 1924, and the U.S. Department of Agriculture did not purchase its first cotton-dusting aircraft until April 16, 1926. The crop duster in the first scene set in 1923 was not commercially available until the late 1930s.

The later series cannon armed Spitfires used in the film were inaccurate, as the RAF had chiefly machine gun-armed Spitfire Mk I/IIs during the Battle of Britain. Limited number of early cannon-armed Spitfires Mk.IB served for brief time with No. 19 Squadron RAF, but these proved to be too unreliable and were soon withdrawn from active service. They also differed slightly from later cannon-armed Spitfire versions, which possessed both autocannons and machine guns, as their armament consisted of single 20 mm British Hispano cannon in each wing only. Ben Affleck's Spitfire is painted with the insignia "RF" – this is an insignia of No. 303 Polish Fighter Squadron.

A sailor has a pack of Marlboro Light cigarettes in his pocket, not introduced until 1972. In the beginning of the movie, a newsreel of 1940 is presented with combat footage in Europe, showing a M-26 Pershing tank fighting in the city of Cologne, which did not happen until March 1945. Earlier, a newsreel of the Battle of Britain in 1940 shows a Focke Wulf 190, which did not see active service until 1941.

Actor Michael Milhoan is seen as an army major advising Admiral Kimmel about island air defenses on Oahu. On the morning of the attack, he is seen commanding a radar station. While playing chess he is addressed as "lieutenant" but, in a further inconsistency, is seen wearing the insignia of an army captain.

Four  destroyers tied abreast of each other at their pier are seen being bombed by the Japanese planes, although this class of ship only entered service with the US Navy in the 1970s. The retired Iowa-class battleship USS Missouri was used to represent USS West Virginia for Dorie Miller's boxing match. West Virginia did not have the modernized World War II-era bridge and masts found on newer U.S. battleships until her reconstruction was finished in 1943, while the Iowa class did not enter service until 1943 onward. In one shot, the USS Arizona memorial is briefly visible in the background during a scene taking place several months before the attack. Miller is shown as a Petty Officer Second Class; but he was actually a Petty Officer Third Class.

Countless other technical lapses rankled film critics, such as Bay's decision to paint the Japanese Zero fighters green (most of the aircraft in the attack were painted light gray/white), even though he knew that was historically inaccurate, because he liked the way the aircraft looked and because it would help audiences differentiate the "good guys from the bad guys".

One of Doolittle's trophies in a display case depicts a model of an F-86 Sabre, which was not flown until 1947.

Late production models of the B-25J were used instead of the early B-25B.

Several shots of the aircraft carrier  depicted it as having an angled flight deck, a technology that was not implemented until after the war, although no U.S. straight flight deck carriers exist anymore. While Hornet was portrayed by a World War II-era vessel, Hornet was a  whereas Lexington was a modernized . As a supercarrier, Constellation has a much longer flight deck than the Yorktown or Essex-class carriers, giving the B-25s a substantially longer (and safer) takeoff run. The Japanese carriers are portrayed more correctly by comparison:  and  did have their bridge/conning tower superstructure on the port side rather than the more common starboard configuration. In the movie it was done by maneuvering an Essex-class aircraft carrier backward to act as Akagi.

An establishing shot of the US Department of War building is clearly a shot of the exterior of the US Capitol Building. In 1941, the War Department was housed in the War Department Building in Washington's Foggy Bottom neighborhood (renamed the Harry S Truman Building in 2000) and in the Munitions Building on the National Mall. Neither structure bears any architectural resemblance to the building shown in the film.

In popular culture
The soundtrack for the 2004 film Team America: World Police contains a song entitled "End of an Act". The song's chorus recounts, "Pearl Harbor sucked, and I miss you" equating the singer's longing for his girlfriend to how much "Michael Bay missed the mark when he made Pearl Harbor" which is "an awful lot, girl". The ballad contains other common criticisms of the film, concluding with the rhetorical question "Why does Michael Bay get to keep on making movies?"

The 2004 film Churchill: The Hollywood Years, a satire on the Hollywood take on history, references the portrayal of the American contribution to the Battle of Britain early in Pearl Harbor.

Soundtrack

The soundtrack to Pearl Harbor on Hollywood Records was nominated for the Golden Globe Award for Best Original Score (Moulin Rouge! won). The original score was composed by Hans Zimmer. The song "There You'll Be" was nominated for the Academy Award and Golden Globe Award for Best Original Song.

 "There You'll Be" – song performed by Faith Hill
 Tennessee – 3:40
 Brothers – 4:04
 ...And Then I Kissed Him – 5:37
 I Will Come Back – 2:54
 Attack – 8:56
 December 7th – 5:08
 War – 5:15
 Heart of a Volunteer – 7:05
Total Album Time 46:21

Certifications

See also

 Sangam, an earlier 1964 Indian film with a strikingly similar storyline, but with only one friend being a pilot in Sangam, whereas both are pilots in Pearl Harbor.
 Tora! Tora! Tora!, 1970 film about the Japanese attack on Pearl Harbor.
 The Chinese Widow, 2017 film about the story described in later half of movie Pearl Harbor in another viewpoint.

References

Citations

Bibliography

 Arroyo, Ernest. Pearl Harbor. New York: MetroBooks, 2001. .
 Barker, A.J. Pearl Harbor (Ballantine's Illustrated History of World War II, Battle Book, No. 10). New York: Ballantine Books, 1969. No ISBN.
 Cohen, Stan. East Wind Rain: A Pictorial History of the Pearl Harbor Attack. Missoula, Montana: Pictorial Histories Publishing Company, 1981. .
 
 Golstein, Donald M., Katherine Dillon and J. Michael Wenger.  The Way it Was: Pearl Harbor (The Original Photographs). Dulles, Virginia: Brassey's Inc., 1995. .
 Kimmel, Husband E. Kimmel's Story. Washington, D.C.: Henry Regnery Co., 1955.
 Prange, Gordon W. At Dawn we Slept: The Untold Story of Pearl Harbor. Harmondsworth, Middlesex, UK: Penguin Books, 1981. .
 Sheehan, Ed. Days of '41: Pearl Harbor Remembered. Honolulu: Kapa Associates, 1977. .
 Sunshine, Linda and Antonia Felix, eds. Pearl Harbor: The Movie and the Moment. New York: Hyperion, 2001. .
 Sullivan, Robert. "What Really Happened." Time, June 4, 2001.
 Thorpe. Briagdier General Elliott R. East Wind Rain: The Intimate Account of an Intelligence Officer in the Pacific, 1939–49. Boston: Gambit Incorporated, 1969. No ISBN.
 Wilmott, H.P. with Tohmatsu Haruo and W. Spencer Johnson. Pearl Harbor. London: Cassell & Co., 2001. .
 Winchester, Jim, ed. Aircraft of World War II (The Aviation Factfile). London: Grange Books, 2004. .
 Wisiniewski, Richard A., ed. Pearl Harbor and the USS Arizona Memorial: A Pictorial History. Honolulu: Pacific Basin Enterprises, 1981, first edition 1977. No ISBN.

External links

 
 
 
 
 Interview with Ben Affleck 
 Interview with Michael Bay 
 Cinemenium site
 Hollywood Abominations

2001 films
2000s English-language films
2000s Japanese-language films
2001 romantic drama films
2000s war drama films
American aviation films
American war drama films
Battle of Britain films
Cultural depictions of Franklin D. Roosevelt
Dyslexia in fiction
Films about the Doolittle Raid
Films about shot-down aviators
Films about the United States Army Air Forces
World War II films based on actual events
Pacific War films
Films set in 1923
Films set in 1941
Films set in 1942
Films set in England
Films set in Hawaii
Films set in Japan
Films set in New York (state)
Films set in Tennessee
Films set in Washington, D.C.
Films shot in Cambridgeshire
Films shot in England
Films shot in Gloucestershire
Films shot in Indiana
Films shot in Hawaii
Films shot in Honolulu
Films shot in Houston
Films shot in Kent
Films shot in Corpus Christi, Texas
Films shot in Los Angeles
Films shot in Mexico
Films shot in Nevada
Films that won the Best Sound Editing Academy Award
Pearl Harbor films
Films about the United States Navy in World War II
Films about nurses
War romance films
World War II aviation films
Touchstone Pictures films
Films scored by Hans Zimmer
Films directed by Michael Bay
Films produced by Jerry Bruckheimer
Films produced by Michael Bay
Cultural depictions of Isoroku Yamamoto
Japan in non-Japanese culture
Films set on aircraft carriers
2000s American films